A gordita in Mexican cuisine is a dish made with masa and stuffed with cheese, meat, or other fillings.  It is similar to the Colombian and Venezuelan arepa. Gordita means "chubby" in Spanish. There are two main variations of this dish, one of which is typically fried in a deep wok-shaped comal, consumed mostly in central and southern Mexico, and another one baked on a regular comal. The most common and representative variation of this dish is the "gordita de chicharrón", filled with chicharron (a spiced stew of pork rind) which is widely consumed throughout Mexico. Gorditas are often eaten as a lunch dish and accompanied by several types of sauce.

Variations
A gordita is typically prepared as a thick tortilla. The dough is most commonly made of nixtamalized corn flour, as also used for tortillas, but can also be of wheat flour, particularly in northern Mexico close to the U.S border. An old variant of corn gorditas uses masa quebrada (broken dough) where the cornmeal is coarsely ground, leaving bits of broken grain. 

In the deep-fried version, once the masa has been prepared, it is separated in small portions, then each one is filled with meat, and shaped like an oblong disc. The pastry is immersed in boiling oil until golden and crispy on the outside. After cooking, the gordita is allowed to stand to drain excess oil, then a small slit is cut into one side to allow vapor and excessive heat to release, and lime juice and salsa are poured inside, which gives the gordita its characteristic flavor. In some regions of Mexico, the slit is also used to stuff additional ingredients, mostly dressings such as fresh cheese, nopal salad, tomatoes, guacamole, potatoes, beans or rajas (sautéed strips of chile). By tradition, gorditas are filled with chicharron, but there are local variations which substitute it by chicken stew, shredded beef, carne al pastor,   eggs with chorizo sausage, carnitas or picadillo. 

The baked version is prepared almost identically to the preparation of a common tortilla, except it is thicker. When the masa is prepared, chicharrón is mixed directly in the dough, instead of being added later. Shaped like a flat circle, then it is placed in a comal until cooked, in most cases not adding additional oil. When slit and filled, this gordita looks like a sandwich made with tortillas instead of bread. This variation is known as Gordita de migas.

Regional variations

In central Mexico, gorditas commonly range from being relatively small, but bulky (about the size of a child's fist), to about the diameter of a "regular" tortilla. In northern Mexico they tend to be larger and flatter.

In most cases gorditas are shallow-fried with vegetable oil in a deep comal, but they can also be deep-fried, making the outside crisper.

In Durango and other states of Northern Mexico, gorditas are commonly made from wheat flour and look like small pita breads. The dough (masa) is identical to that of a wheat flour tortilla. It is cooked on a comal with a hot piece of metal placed on top that resembles a clothes iron. The gordita fills with steam, and a small slit is cut into one side where it can be filled with guisados.

Similar dishes
The Salvadoran dish pupusa is similar to a gordita, except completely sealed and typically served with curtido, a lightly pickled cabbage relish.
In Venezuela and Colombia an arepa (a type of cornbread) is often served stuffed with various ingredients. It is prepared in a similar way as a Mexican gordita, except the final dish is smaller and slimmer.
In China the roujiamo is a similar dish that means 'meat sandwiched in bread', is a street food originating from the cuisine of Shaanxi Province and widely consumed all over China.

Other gorditas

The fast food restaurant chain Taco Bell offers a wheat flour gordita that has limited similarity to gorditas as served in Mexico and is more akin to a pita bread taco.

In eastern and central Mexico "gorditas de nata" (cream gorditas) are consumed often as a breakfast dish or snack. It is a sweet cake similar to a tiny but extremely thick pancake made with milk cream or clotted cream, called nata in Mexico, cinnamon, sugar, and white wheat flour. They are named "gordita" too, due to their appearance, similar to the original fried gordita, but their taste is sweet, not salty. Besides their appearance, this snack is not related to the original one. The same flour preparation used to prepare gorditas de nata is also used to cook a flat cookie variation, which by extension it is also called "gordita", but in contrast, it is thin and crispy, not thick. To differentiate them, these flat cookies are called "sugar gorditas" instead.

See also

References

External links
 

Mexican cuisine
Spanish slang
Tortilla-based dishes
Stuffed dishes